Professor Michael Archer AM, FAA, Dist FRSN (born 1945, Sydney, New South Wales) is an Australian paleontologist specialising in Australian vertebrates.  He is a professor at the School of Biological, Earth & Environmental Sciences, University of New South Wales.  His previous appointments include Director of the Australian Museum 1999–2004 and Dean of Science at the University of New South Wales 2004–2009.

Education and career 
Archer was born in Sydney but raised in the United States and studied at Princeton University. From 1972 to 1978, he was the curator of mammals at the Queensland Museum. Since 1983, he has been involved with the exploration of the Riversleigh fossil site in Queensland.

He is opposed to creationism and regularly engages in active debates with creationists.

During his time as director of the Australian Museum, he was the initiator of attempts to clone the Thylacinus cynocephalus, the Tasmanian tiger, an animal extinct since 1936. Archer has stated that he is obsessed with bringing the thylacine back to life via cloning. He has said that his obsession is going to push the research further and further until he and his team will have their first living thylacine clone.

In 2011, Archer published an article asserting that a vegetarian diet causes more suffering and deaths of animals than an omnivorous diet based on sustainable husbandry.

Archer is married to the paleontologist Suzanne Hand, with whom he has two daughters.

Honours
1984: Clarke Medal, Royal Society of New South Wales
1987: Inaugural Queensland Museum Medal for Research
1989: Australian Heritage Award for Nature Conservation
1990: Inaugural Eureka Prize for the Promotion of Science
1990: Inaugural IBM Conservation Award for Research
1994: Von Mueller Medal, ANZAAS
1996: Verco Medal, Royal Society of South Australia
1998: Australian Skeptic of the Year
2002: Fellow, Australian Academy of Science (FAA)
2008: Member of the Order of Australia (AM)
2009: Fellow of the Royal Society of New South Wales (FRSN)
2019: Romer-Simpson Medal of the Society of Vertebrate Paleontology (USA)

Publications
 Archer, M. (Ed.) (1982). Carnivorous Marsupials.  Royal Zoological Society of New South Wales, 1982.  (2 volumes)
 Archer, M. and Clayton, C. (Eds.) (1984). Vertebrate Zoogeography & Evolution in Australasia: Animals in Space & Time. Hesperian Press. 
 Archer, M. and Flannery, T.F. with Grigg, G.C. (1985) The Kangaroo. Kevin Weldon Press. 
 Archer, M., Hand, S. and Godthelp, H. (1986). Uncovering Australia's Dreamtime. Surrey Beatty & Sons 
 Archer, M. (Ed.) (1987). Possums and Opossums: Studies in Evolution.  Surrey Beatty & Sons in association with the Royal Zoological Society of New South Wales. 
 Cronin, L. (Ed.) (1987). Koala: Australia's Endearing Marsupial. Reed Books Pty, Ltd.  (text by Archer et al.)
 Long, J.A., Archer, M., Flannery, T. and Hand, S. (2002). Prehistoric mammals of Australia and New Guinea: One hundred million years of evolution. University of NSW Press. 
 Archer, M., Hand, S. and Godthelp, H. (2000). Australia's lost world: Prehistoric animals of Riversleigh. Indiana University Press.

References

External links
 Professor Michael Archer, School of Biological, Earth and Environmental Sciences, University of New South Wales. Retrieved September 26, 2018
 

Living people
1945 births
Critics of vegetarianism
Scientists from Sydney
Princeton University alumni
Members of the Order of Australia
Fellows of the Australian Academy of Science
Fellows of the Royal Society of New South Wales